Tom Hansen (born 25 February 1948) is a Danish middle-distance runner. He competed in the 1500 metres at the 1968 Summer Olympics and the 1972 Summer Olympics.

References

1948 births
Living people
Athletes (track and field) at the 1968 Summer Olympics
Athletes (track and field) at the 1972 Summer Olympics
Danish male middle-distance runners
Olympic athletes of Denmark
Place of birth missing (living people)
20th-century Danish people